Dacrydium cornwalliana is a species of conifer in the family Podocarpaceae. It is found in Indonesia and Papua New Guinea.

References

cornwalliana
Least concern plants
Taxonomy articles created by Polbot
Taxobox binomials not recognized by IUCN